Sunt Förnuft (Swedish: Common Sense) is a Swedish language finance magazine published in Stockholm, Sweden, which is owned by the Swedish Taxpayers' Association. Founded in 1921, it is one of the oldest magazines in the country.

History and profile
Sunt Förnuft was first published in 1921. The magazine is owned and published by the Swedish Taxpayers' Association. It is delivered to the members of the association. The headquarters of the magazine is in Stockholm. It is published eight times per year.

Sten Nordin, former mayor of Stockholm, served as the chief editor of Sunt Förnuft, which covers articles on taxes and economic development. As of 2015 Åke Jungdalen was the chief editor of the magazine.

In 2001 Sunt Förnuft had a circulation of 171,000 copies. In 2014 its circulation was 43,500 copies.

See also
 List of magazines in Sweden

References

1921 establishments in Sweden
Business magazines published in Sweden
Magazines established in 1921
Magazines published in Stockholm
Swedish-language magazines
Eight times annually magazines